Pan Jiazheng (November 12, 1927 – July 13, 2012) was a Chinese hydraulic engineer and poet.

Biography
Pan was born in Shaoxing, Zhejiang, China, and lost his father at a young age. He was accepted by the Department of Civil Engineering of Zhejiang University, but almost dropped out because of poverty. His professor, Qian Lingxi, saw promise in him and paid for his tuition out of his own pocket until his graduation in 1950. He was an academician and the Vice-president of the Chinese Academy of Engineering (CAE), and an academician of Chinese Academy of Sciences. He served as the former Chief Director of the Chinese Society for Rock Mechanics and Engineering, and the technical chief for the Three Gorges Dam.

References

External links
 ChinaVitae - Pan Jiazheng 
 Chinese Academy of Engineering - Pan Jiazheng 

1927 births
2012 deaths
20th-century Chinese poets
Chinese science fiction writers
Engineers from Zhejiang
Members of the Chinese Academy of Engineering
Members of the Chinese Academy of Sciences
People's Republic of China poets
People's Republic of China science writers
Poets from Zhejiang
Writers from Shaoxing
Zhejiang University alumni